Robert MacDonald may refer to:

Robert MacDonald (cricketer) (1870–1946), Australian cricketer
Robert J. MacDonald (1914–1987), politician in Michigan
Robert MacDonald (British politician), British Member of Parliament for Glasgow Cathcart, 1923–1929
Robert MacDonald (special effects artist) (1912–1989), visual effects artist of Ben-Hur
Robert David MacDonald (1929–2004), Scottish playwright, translator, and theatre director
Robert E. Macdonald (born 1947), American mayor of Lewiston, Maine
Robert W. MacDonald, insurance executive
Robert MacDonald (minister) (1813-1893), Moderator of the General Assembly of the Free Church of Scotland in 1882

Robert McDonald may refer to:
Robert McDonald (missionary) (1829–1913), Episcopalian missionary in the Arctic
Robert Ross McDonald (1888–1964), Australian politician
Robert McDonald, known as Whitey McDonald (1902–1956), Canadian soccer player who earned two caps with Ireland
Robert N. McDonald (born 1952), justice of the Maryland Court of Appeals
Robert McDonald (Medal of Honor), American Indian Wars soldier, see 5th Infantry Regiment
Robert McDonald (footballer), footballer for Manchester City

Rob MacDonald or McDonald may refer to:
Rob McDonald (born 1959), English footballer for Hull City, Newcastle United
Rob MacDonald (born 1978), Canadian mixed martial arts fighter

Bob MacDonald or McDonald may refer to:
Bob MacDonald (golfer) (1885–1960), Scottish-American professional golfer
Bob McDonald (Scottish footballer) (1895–1971), footballer for Inverness Caledonian, Tottenham Hotspur
Bob McDonald (Australian footballer) (1895–1979), Australian rules footballer for South Melbourne
Bob McDonald (ice hockey) (1923–1977), former professional ice hockey player
Bob McDonald (bowls) (1933–2006), New Zealand bowls player
Bob MacDonald (baseball) (born 1965), American former Major League Baseball pitcher
Bob MacDonald (journalist) (1929–2006), Canadian columnist for the Toronto Telegram and Toronto Sun
Bob McDonald (politician) (1931–2002), Canadian Member of Parliament and football player
Bob McDonald (businessman) (born 1953), U.S. Secretary of Veterans Affairs, CEO Procter and Gamble
Bob McDonald (science journalist) (born 1951), for Canadian program Quirks and Quarks

Bobby McDonald may refer to:
Bobby McDonald (born 1955), Scottish footballer for Coventry City and Oxford United

See also
Bob McDonnell (born 1954), former Governor of Virginia